Jan Strandlund (born 28 October 1962) is a Swedish curler and curling coach.

In 1996 he was inducted into the Swedish Curling Hall of Fame.

Teams

Men's

Mixed

Record as a coach of national teams

References

External links
 
 Jan Strandlund | Olofsson Bil 

Living people
1962 births
Swedish male curlers
European curling champions
Swedish curling champions
Swedish curling coaches
20th-century Swedish people